"Wake Up World" is the 2008 official single for the Swedish charity Hjälp Haiti ("Help Haiti"). The song was written by Erik Anjou and interpreted by Karl Martindahl, Daniel Karlsson and Robin Bengtsson. The initiative for the song was by Andreas Wistrand of the band Highlights. Songwriter Erik Anjou and music producer Keith Almgren donated all proceeds of the song to FRII (making up 103 organizations).

Hjälp Haiti
"Hjälp Haiti" was a collection of 14 different organisations engaged in helping Haiti after its earthquake. Under FRII, (Frivilligorganisationernas Insamlingsråd) and TV4 Group, the organizations included: 
ActionAid
Erikshjälpen
Frälsningsarmén (The Salvation Army)
Hoppets Stjärna
Läkarmissionen, 
Plan Sverige
PMU InterLife
Rädda Barnen (Save the Children)
Röda Korset (The Red Cross)
Skandinaviska Barnmissionen
SOS-Barnbyar (SOS Children's Villages)
Svenska FN-förbundet
Svenska Kyrkan (Church of Sweden)
Unicef Sverige.

Participating artists
Artists involved in the project included:
Karl Martindahl, Daniel Karlsson and Robin Bengtsson - vocals
Fredrik Wännman and Lars Norgren / Ramtitam - recorded, mixed and mastering
Kristoffer Folin - assistant technician
Johan Bergqvist - guitar and keyboard
Mårten Bengtsson - bass
Fredrik Svensson - drums
Johannes Lagtun and Kristoffer Folin - disc cover

Performances
The song was performed live on TV4 television station's program Nyhetsmorgon with Andreas Wistrand made the presentation alongside Maria Ros Jernberg, communications manager of FRII.

References

External links 
 FRII - Hjälp Haiti

2010 singles
Charity singles
2010 songs